Dolphin is a side-scrolling video game created by Matthew Hubbard for the Atari 2600 and released by Activision in 1983. Hubbard later designed Zenji for Activision. Dolphin requires the player to use audio cues in order to survive.

Gameplay

The player controls a dolphin attempting to flee from a giant squid. It must avoid colliding with packs of seahorses while navigating both forward- and backward-moving currents (indicated by arrows pointed with or against the dolphin's direction, respectively) which accelerate or decelerate its speed. Occasionally a seagull appears above the water's surface which, if touched, permits the player a short period of invincibility. During this time, the dolphin is able to touch the squid and drive it away.

The dolphin's sonar sounds to indicate how to avoid seahorses:  a high pitch indicates an opening near the water's surface, and a lower resonance indicates a seafloor passage.

Reception

Dolphin won the "Best Videogame Audio/Visual Effects (Less than 16K ROM)" category in the Electronic Games 1984 Arcade Awards.

See also

List of Atari 2600 games
List of Activision games: 1980–1999

References

External links
Dolphin at Atari Mania
Dolphin review by Keita Iida at AtariHQ

1983 video games
Atari 2600 games
Atari 2600-only games
Activision games
Fiction about dolphins
Side-scrolling video games
Video games with underwater settings
Video games developed in the United States